Southwestern Yacht Club may refer to:

 Southwestern Yacht Club (California), a yacht club formed in 1925 in San Diego, California, United States.
 Southwestern Yacht Club (Texas) a yacht club formed in 1945 in Corpus Christi, Texas, United States.